Corina Dumitru (born 24 October 1973) is a Romanian swimmer. She competed in the women's 200 metre butterfly event at the 1992 Summer Olympics.

References

External links
 

1973 births
Living people
Romanian female butterfly swimmers
Olympic swimmers of Romania
Swimmers at the 1992 Summer Olympics
Place of birth missing (living people)